Anajá Caetano was an Afro-Brazilian writer who wrote about slavery, religion and discrimination. Caetano was the first woman to write a novel in 20th-century Brazil.

Biography
Caetano was born in São Sebastião do Paraíso in Brazil. She was of Angolan descent, specifically of the Chokwe people. 

Caetano wrote about Afro-Brazilians, including slavery, religion and discrimination. 

Her book Negra Efigênia, paixão do senhor branco was published in 1966. It was the first novel written and published by a woman in Brazil in the 20th century. The novel, set in the 19th century, examines the life of Iphigenia, an enslaved woman who is kidnapped by a white farmer to be his wife.

References

Further reading
Lopess, Neil. Dicionário literário afro-brasileiro, 2nd edition, Pallas Editora, 2015, Section 3. 

Brazilian women novelists
People from Minas Gerais
Afro-Brazilian women
20th-century Brazilian novelists
20th-century Brazilian women writers